Terence Palliser (born 22 March 1948) is a British cross-country skier. He competed in the men's 15 kilometre event at the 1972 Winter Olympics.

References

External links
 

1948 births
Living people
British male cross-country skiers
Olympic cross-country skiers of Great Britain
Cross-country skiers at the 1972 Winter Olympics
Sportspeople from Nottingham